Power Moves: The Table is the third solo studio album released by SPM. It was released on December 22, 1998 via Dope House Records. The album also contains a screwed bonus disc by DJ Screw called "Screwing Up the World".

Track listing

References

External links

1998 albums
South Park Mexican albums